Ischnura chingaza is a species of damselfly in the genus Ischnura, of the family Coenagrionidae, endemic to the Eastern Ranges of the Colombian Andes. It was first described by Emilio Realpe in 2010.

Etymology 
Ischnura chingaza is named after the Chingaza National Natural Park, where the species has been found.

Description 
The back part of the head is light yellow. The labia are white. The male samples described have black with light yellow compound eyes, while the eyes females are black with light blue.

The egg stage of the species ranged from two weeks to one month. The average larvae stage was 258.2 days, longer than of other species of Ischnura.

Habitat 
The breeding area are freshwater ponds. The species is relatively tolerant to the presence of cattle. Ischnura chingaza also has been reported in the wetlands of Parque Metropolitano La Florida and La Conejera.

See also 

List of flora and fauna named after the Muisca
Chingaza National Natural Park, Thomas van der Hammen Natural Reserve, wetlands of Bogotá

References

Bibliography

External links 
 Ischnura chingaza - photo
 

Ischnura
Odonata of South America
Endemic fauna of Colombia
Arthropods of Colombia
Altiplano Cundiboyacense
Chingaza
Insects described in 2010